Rafael Calvo Ortega (born 26 August 1933) is a Spanish politician who served as Minister of Labour from February 1978 to May 1980. He was also secretary-general of the Union of the Democratic Centre (UCD) in 1981 and president of the Democratic and Social Centre (CDS) between 1991 and 1998. In 2008 he received the Txemi Cantera International Social Economy Prize from ASLE, which recognises "those people and organizations that have stood out for their support to the Social Economy".

References

1933 births
Living people
University of Salamanca alumni
Government ministers of Spain
20th-century Spanish politicians
Labour ministers of Spain